Neural Audio Corporation was an audio research company based in Kirkland, Washington. 

The company specialized in high-end audio research. It helped XM Satellite Radio launch their service using the Neural Codec Pre-Conditioner, which was designed to provide higher quality audio at lower bitrates.

Background
The company was co-founded by two audio engineers, Paul Hubert and Robert Reams in 2000. 

Neural was mostly known for its work in the field of audio processing and its "Neural Surround" sound format. ESPN, FOX, NBC, CBS, Sony, Universal, Warner Bros, THX, Yamaha, Pioneer Electronics, Ford, Honda, Nissan, Vivendi and SiriusXM were partners and customers in connection with sound for movies, broadcasting applications, music reproduction and video games.

In 2009 the company was acquired by DTS Inc. for $15 million in cash.

References

External links
Celebrity Voice Changer
Mixing & Mastering Services

Audio engineering